= Cake (electric motorcycles) =

Electric Motorcycle Company

Cake is a Swedish maker of electric motorcycles and mopeds. It is headquartered in Stockholm, Sweden and commenced operations in 2016. The first model made available to the public was named Kalk and was introduced in 2018. Cake was founded by Stefan Ytterborn who also is the CEO of the company.

Cake has struggled financially recently including not making payroll.

Cake has also had to recall at least two models, including one due to battery fires.

In February 2024, Cake filed for bankruptcy in Sweden.

== Model families ==
Cake currently manufactures three main models, all built on an electric drivetrain. The model families are called Makka, Ösa and Kalk. Each product family is available in various editions and configurations.

=== Makka ===
Makka is an all-electric moped, available in both commuter and commercial configurations. Top speeds range between 25 km/h (15.5 mph) and 45 km/h (28 mph), depending on model, and they are all street legal. The commercial editions are designed for short-haul transports, feature built-in cargo racks and have a range of up to 110 kilometers.

=== Ösa ===
The Ösa is built around a unibeam-concept that allows accessories such as baskets and trailers to be mounted directly on the bike. It has a battery that can be used both to run the vehicle as well as a power source for any external device attached to it. It is available both as a moped as well as a motorbike, with a range of up to 160 kilometers (100 miles).

=== Kalk ===
The Kalk was Cake´s first electric motorcycle and was made available to the general public in 2018. Today it is available in several builds and configurations, both street legal versions and off-road models.

=== Kalk AP ===
A special edition of the Kalk, the Kalk AP, is used by park rangers at the Southern African Wildlife College (SAWC), situated adjacent to the Kruger National Park, South Africa. The Kalk AP has been modified from the standard off-road Kalk by adding a lightweight frame, a sealed drivetrain and a different suspension.

== Racing series ==
Cake launched a new electric racing format, Cake Worlds, in 2021. Compared to traditional motocross racing, the Cake Worlds format utilises a tighter, narrower track, adapted to suit the inherent properties of the lighter, more responsive electric motorcycles used. The first time the format was used was on the island of Gotland, where the first Cake Worlds Race took place in August 2021. Professional mountainbike rider Seth Stevens (USA) was crowned 2021 Cake Worlds Race champion.

In 2022, the Cake Worlds Race was expanded to include four competitions, taking place in the US, France and Sweden.
